Garrett Gilkey (born July 9, 1990) is a former American football guard who played in the National Football League (NFL). He was drafted by the Cleveland Browns in the seventh round of the 2013 NFL Draft and also played for the Tampa Bay Buccaneers. He played college football at Chadron State.

Early life and college career
Gilkey was born in Lemont, Illinois, a village southwest of Chicago. Gilkey grew up in Naperville and moved with his parents and four siblings to the town of Sandwich, Illinois at age 12. As a freshman, Gilkey attended Sandwich Community High School but transferred to Aurora Christian High School in nearby Aurora.

After graduating from Aurora Christian High in 2008, Gilkey enrolled at Chadron State College, an NCAA Division II school in northwestern Nebraska. At Chadron State, Gilkey played in 37 games with 34 starts and earned first-team All-American honors from D2Football.com. Gilkey was one of three Division II players invited to the 2012 Senior Bowl.

Professional career

Cleveland Browns
On April 27, 2013, he was selected by the Cleveland Browns in the seventh round, 227 overall pick of the 2013 NFL Draft. On May 24, 2013, he agreed to a four-year deal with the Cleveland Browns.

Tampa Bay Buccaneers
Gilkey was claimed off waivers by the Tampa Bay Buccaneers on September 1, 2014. On July 26, 2016, Gilkey was waived by Tampa Bay due to a failed physical.

Personal life
Gilkey received a Master of Engineering from the University of Alabama at Birmingham and his MBA from the Indiana University Bloomington. He is the president and CEO of HGC Development Group, a design-build firm based in Tampa, Florida.

References

External links
Chadron State Eagles bio

1990 births
Living people
Chadron State Eagles football players
Cleveland Browns players
Tampa Bay Buccaneers players
American football offensive guards
Sportspeople from Naperville, Illinois
People from Sandwich, Illinois
People from Lemont, Illinois
Players of American football from Illinois